WIBC (93.1 MHz) is a commercial FM radio station in Indianapolis, Indiana. It is owned by Urban One and broadcasts a news/talk format. The studios are located at 40 Monument Circle in downtown Indianapolis. The transmitter and antenna are located near South Post Road and Burk Road on the far east side of Indianapolis. The station airs mostly local conservative talk shows on weekdays, with several nationally syndicated programs, including Dana Loesch, Chad Benson, Coast to Coast AM with George Noory and on weekends Kim Komando. Weekends also feature shows on money, health, gardening, computers and guns. Some weekend hours are paid brokered programming. Some hours begin with world and national news from Fox News Radio.

For nearly seven decades, WIBC broadcast on the AM radio frequency of 1070 kHz. On December 26, 2007, WIBC's call letters and talk programming moved to the FM dial at co-owned 93.1 MHz. Also on that date, the 1070 kHz frequency took the call sign WFNI and began an all-sports format as "1070 The Fan".

WIBC broadcasts in HD, using its HD2 signal for WFNI's local sports format, also heard on translators 93.5 W228CX and 107.5 W298BB. WIBC's HD3 signal carries a simulcast of sister station 1070 WFNI, which airs the national ESPN Radio Network.

History

Early years and heyday as WNAP

93.1 FM in Indianapolis first signed on as WIBC-FM on December 5, 1960. It aired an automated classical music format.

On July 22, 1968, the station was re-launched as WNAP. It was the first FM station in the Indianapolis market to broadcast a hybrid formatted mix of both AOR and Top 40 hits, better known as "Rock 40" an ancestor of the CHR format, and was in direct competition with Top 40 leader 1310 WIFE. In 1970, WNAP began broadcasting in stereo. According to the documentary film Naptown Rock Radio Wars, station and program managers from across the United States came to Indianapolis to listen to WNAP in order to figure out the unique style of "The Buzzard" so they could emulate its success at their own stations such as WVBF in Boston and WMMS in Cleveland. The classic top of the hour station identification from this era featured the sound of two thunderbolts and the distinctive voice of WIBC's Chuck Riley, brother of WNAP's DJ Michael D. "Buster Bodine" Hanks, intoning the phrase, "The wrath of The Buzzard! WNAP, Indianapolis". Later in the 1970s and early 1980s, the station was rebranded as "WNAP Stereo 93 FM, The Buzzard".

Demise of "The Buzzard"
On March 4, 1986, suffering from a fall in ratings due to competition from WFBQ, the format of 93.1 was changed to a rock-driven hot adult contemporary format, and the call letters became WEAG with branding as "Eagle 93." The format was later changed to classic hits with the call letters WKLR on August 14, 1987. On April 1, 1988, WKLR changed from classic hits to oldies

WNAP returned at 5:00 p.m. on September 9, 1994, when WKLR was changed back to a classic hits station with a strong focus on the "greatest hits of the 70s." This incarnation of WNAP later moved in a more classic rock direction playing "classic rock that really rocks", with the syndicated Howard Stern Show carried in the morning in what was a futile attempt to compete with WFBQ's locally-dominant Bob and Tom Show. Despite on-air boasts that WNAP was going to "kick Q-95's ass", the classic rock format was a failure.

Radio Now 93.1
After weeks of stunting, WNAP changed to contemporary hits on March 28, 2000, at 6:00 a.m., with new call letters WNOU and the name "Radio Now." Radio Now's first song was "The Rockafeller Skank" by Fatboy Slim. "Radio Now" debuted as a new type of CHR station with a very small playlist and featured the top hits of the day at the top of every hour. The station received some national notice in November 2004, when its morning show conducted the first interview with Indiana Pacers player Ron Artest following the Pacers–Pistons brawl.

Orbital 93.1
In 2006, WNOU launched an HD2 subchannel, dubbed "Orbital 93.1", which offered a rhythmic contemporary format with emphasis on current and classic dance music. On October 9, 2007, Orbital was discontinued, being replaced with the Radio NOW format for one day after the format ended on 93.1, and before it moved to 100.9, serving as a buffer for the format.

WIBC moves to FM
On October 8, 2007, at Noon, after playing "When You're Gone" by Avril Lavigne, 93.1 began stunting with Christmas music under the placeholder callsign of WEXM, being promoted as "The 93 Days of Christmas." The Christmas format was a place holder as part of the transition to moving the talk programming of WIBC from 1070 AM to 93.1 FM. Initially planned, as the branding implied, to last 93 days from October 8 to January 8, the change-over was moved up to December 26. The switch came after Emmis acquired local radio rights to the Indianapolis Colts football team. To prevent frequent preemption of programming and tedious shufflings of games on its stations, it was decided to move WIBC to the FM frequency immediately after Christmas, and make 1070 AM a sports station as "AM 1070 The Fan", with its call sign changing to WFNI. This time, the "-FM" suffix was not required on 93.1's call sign because there would no longer be a WIBC on the AM band. The WNAP call letters are now used at a gospel-formatted AM station licensed in Norristown, Pennsylvania, serving the Philadelphia market.

Upon the demise of "Radio Now", Radio One (now Urban One) purchased the intellectual property of the station from Emmis Communications. Two days later, on October 10, the "Radio Now" branding, format and logo were installed on the new 100.9 WNOU (formerly WYJZ, now WHHH). Local Radio One management said that they would offer the displaced staffers of 93.1 WNOU the first chance of joining the new station's lineup, and would use the same imaging as the former WNOU at 93.1. Emmis also stated that they would release displaced Radio Now staffers from their "non-compete" contracts.

On June 13, 2022, Emmis announced that it would sell its Indianapolis stations to Urban One.

References

External links

WIBC-AM history
Indiana Radio Archive, WIBC
Jeff Pigeon Leaving WIBC

IBC
Radio stations established in 1960
News and talk radio stations in the United States
American Basketball Association flagship radio stations
Urban One stations
Mass media in Indianapolis
1938 establishments in Indiana